Jean Jenkins (17 March 1922 - 12 September 1990) was an American-born ethnomusicologist who spent most of her career based in the UK and travelled all over the world to collect sound recordings, slides and musical instruments.

Biography

Jean Jenkins was born in Arkansas and studied anthropology and musicology in Missouri during the 1940s. In 1949 she arrived in Britain with her first husband, and continued her studies at the University of London, at the School of Oriental and African Studies.

Jenkins travelled widely throughout Africa and Central Asia between the 1950s and 1980s creating exceptional recordings, and taking detailed notes. She was a key figure in laying the ground for the contemporary world music scene, and as well as insight into traditional music from around the world, her archives reveal a larger than life woman, who fled McCarthy, was friends with Haile Selassie and who was meticulous, packing silk handkerchiefs and girdles whenever she travelled.
In 1954 she joined the staff of the Horniman Museum in South London. During her time at the museum she built up the musical instrument collections from developing countries, conducted important fieldwork in Ethiopia (throughout the 1960s) and created a centre for ethnomusicology. Meanwhile, she married her second husband and obtained a British passport in order to avoid being deported to the US for her trade union work. The marriage was dissolved in 1961.

A strong-willed and energetic woman, during the 1960s and 1970s Jean Jenkins travelled extensively throughout Southern Europe, Asia and Africa. Among many other places, she visited Uganda (1966 and 1968), Malaysia (1972), Indonesia (1973) Afghanistan (1974) Algeria and Morocco, and Turkey and Syria (1975). During these extended trips she collected a wealth of information in the form of sound recordings, slides and photographs, and also kept regular diaries. In addition, she collected a vast range of musical instruments.

After curating the 1976 exhibition "Music and Musical Instruments for the World of Islam" at the Horniman Museum, thereby introducing the collections to a much wider audience, in 1978 she left the museum and continued to work independently in Edinburgh, France and Germany. In 1983 she curated the important exhibition "Man and Music" at the Royal Scottish Museum in Edinburgh. She died in London on 12 September 1990.

Collections at the National Museums of Scotland

In 1980 the National Museum of Scotland acquired Jean Jenkins's own collection of musical instruments and in 1990 the museum was bequeathed her entire archive of field recordings, indexes, diaries and 13,000 slides and photographs. Together, they form a unique record of musical traditions which, in some places, have disappeared.

Publications

 Jenkins, Jean Man and Music, Edinburgh, Royal Scottish Museum, 1983
 Jenkins, Jean and Olsen, Poul Rovsing Music and Musical Instruments in the World of Islam, World of Islam Festival, 1976
 Jenkins, Jean, Ethiopia Volume 2, "Music of the Nomads"

Recordings

 Jenkins, Jean and Olsen, Poul Rovsing Music in the World of Islam, including The Human Voice, Lutes, Strings, Flutes and Trumpets, Reeds and Bagpipes and Drums and Rhythms (Tangent TGS 131 through 136), 1976
 Jenkins, Jean, Ethiopia Volume 1, "Music of the Central Highlands", Tangent TGM Mono, 1970
 Jenkins, Jean, Ethiopia Volume 2, "Music of the Desert Nomads", Tangent TGM 102 Mono, 1970
 Jenkins, Jean, Ethiopia Volume 3, "Music of the Eritrea", Tangent TGM  Mono, 1970
 Jenkins, Jean, Vocal Music From Mongolia, Volume 1, Tangent TGM, LP format, UK 1977
 Jenkins, Jean, Instrumental Music from Mongolia, Volume 2, Tangent TM, LP format, UK 1977

References

Further reading

1922 births
1990 deaths
American ethnomusicologists
Academics from Arkansas
Alumni of SOAS University of London
20th-century American musicologists
Women ethnomusicologists
American expatriates in the United Kingdom